This is a list of events in animation in 2017.

Events

January
 January 15: Your Name becomes the highest grossing anime film, grossing nearly $300 million.
 January 16:
 PBS Kids Channel launches and became available on many PBS member stations as a digital subchannel (particularly those that in the past, PBS had routinely supplied content for their independently programmed, kid-targeted subchannels) and through apps and streaming services, features a broad mix of the public television service's current inventory of children's programming.
 The final episode of Regular Show airs.

February
 February 19: The Simpsons episode "The Cad and the Hat" premieres, guest starring Seth Green.
 February 26: 89th Academy Awards:
Piper by Alan Barillaro and Marc Sondheimer wins the Academy Award for Best Animated Short Film.
 Zootopia by Byron Howard, Rich Moore, and Clark Spencer wins the Academy Award for Best Animated Feature.

March
 March 12: The Simpsons episode "22 for 30" airs, in which the couch gag is animated by Bill Plympton, the fifth time he has done so.

April
 April 2: The Simpsons episode "The Caper Chase" premieres, guest starring scientist Neil deGrasse Tyson.
 April 21: PBS Kids launched "PBS Kids Family Night," a weekly block on Friday evenings (with encore airings on Saturday and Sunday evenings) that showcase themed programming, premieres or special "movie-length" episodes of new and existing PBS Kids children's programs.

July
 July 28: Tony Leondis' The Emoji Movie, produced by Sony Pictures Animation is released. It grossed more than $217 million, but was widely panned for its poor script, product placement, and lack of originality and plot, and was named by several major outlets as one of the worst films of 2017.

August
 August 12: DuckTales, a reboot of the original 1987 series premiered on Disney XD.

September
 September 9: Sprout rebrands to Universal Kids which caters to children aged 2–11 in primetime, and features content from NBCU-owned DreamWorks Animation as well as child-specific reality TV shows. However, Sprout's preschool-specific programming will remain a major part of the schedule, as a programming block airing from 3:00 a.m. to 6:00 p.m..

October
 October 6: My Little Pony: The Movie a film based on My Little Pony: Friendship is Magic is released in theaters.
 October 17: Animator Chris Savino is suspended by Nickelodeon due to allegations of sexual harassment.
 October 30: Two Balloons, a stop-motion animated short film written and directed by Mark Smith is released.

November
 November 22: Disney releases Coco by Pixar.

December
 December 13: Dumbo and The Sinking of the Lusitania are added to the National Film Registry.

Awards
 Academy Award for Best Animated Feature: Coco
 Academy Award for Best Animated Short Film: Dear Basketball
 American Cinema Editors Award for Best Edited Animated Feature Film: Coco
 Annecy International Animated Film Festival Cristal du long métrage: Lu over the Wall
 Annie Award for Best Animated Feature: Coco
 Annie Award for Best Animated Feature—Independent: The Breadwinner
 Asia Pacific Screen Award for Best Animated Feature Film: Window Horses: The Poetic Persian Epiphany of Rosie Ming
 BAFTA Award for Best Animated Film: Coco
 César Award for Best Animated Film: The Big Bad Fox and Other Tales...
 Chicago Film Critics Association Award for Best Animated Film: Coco
 Critics' Choice Movie Award for Best Animated Feature: Coco
 Dallas–Fort Worth Film Critics Association Award for Best Animated Film: Coco
 European Film Award for Best Animated Film: Loving Vincent
 Florida Film Critics Circle Award for Best Animated Film: Coco
 Golden Globe Award for Best Animated Feature Film: Coco
 Golden Reel Award for Animated Feature Film: Coco
 Goya Award for Best Animated Film: Tad Jones: The Hero Returns
 Hollywood Animation Award: Coco
 Japan Academy Prize for Animation of the Year: In This Corner of the World
 Japan Media Arts Festival Animation Grand Prize: In This Corner of the World and Lu over the Wall
 Kids' Choice Award for Favorite Animated Movie: Coco
 Los Angeles Film Critics Association Award for Best Animated Film: The Breadwinner
 Mainichi Film Awards - Animation Grand Award: Complex × Complex
 National Board of Review Award for Best Animated Film: Coco
 New York Film Critics Circle Award for Best Animated Film: Coco
 Online Film Critics Society Award for Best Animated Film: Coco
 Producers Guild of America Award for Best Animated Motion Picture: Coco
 San Diego Film Critics Society Award for Best Animated Film: My Life as a Zucchini
 San Francisco Film Critics Circle Award for Best Animated Feature: Coco
 Satellite Award for Best Animated or Mixed Media Feature: Coco
 Saturn Award for Best Animated Film: Coco
 St. Louis Gateway Film Critics Association Award for Best Animated Film: Coco
 Tokyo Anime Award: A Silent Voice and Yuri!!! on Ice
 Toronto Film Critics Association Award for Best Animated Film: The Breadwinner
 Visual Effects Society Award for Outstanding Visual Effects in an Animated Feature: Coco
 Washington D.C. Area Film Critics Association Award for Best Animated Feature: Coco

Films released

 January 1 - Three Heroes and the King of the Sea (Russia)
 January 6 - Kizumonogatari III: Reiketsu-hen (Japan)
 January 7:
 GG Bond: Guarding (China)
 Kabaneri of the Iron Fortress film (Japan)
 January 12 - Bunyan and Babe (United States)
 January 13 - Backkom Bear: Agent 008 (China)
 January 14 - Chain Chronicle Light of Haecceitas: Part 2 (Japan)
 January 17 - Surf's Up 2: WaveMania (United States)
 January 21 - Black Butler: Book of the Atlantic (Japan)
 January 24 - Justice League Dark (United States)
 January 28 - Boonie Bears: Entangled Worlds (China)
 January 31:
 Barbie: Video Game Hero (United States)
 Scooby-Doo! Shaggy's Showdown (United States)
 February 1 - Release From Heaven (Iran)
 February 3 - Genocidal Organ (Japan)
 February 4 - Lupin the Third: Goemon Ishikawa's Spray of Blood (Japan)
 February 10: 
 The Lego Batman Movie (United States)
 Tokimeki Restaurant ☆☆☆ the Movie: MIRACLE6 (Japan)
 February 11 - Chain Chronicle Light of Haecceitas: Part 3 (Japan)
 February 12 - Richard the Stork (Germany, Luxembourg, Norway, and Belgium)
 February 17 - Have a Nice Day (China)
 February 18 - Sword Art Online The Movie: Ordinal Scale (Japan)
 February 25:
 Digimon Adventure tri. Loss (Japan)
 Overlord: The Dark Warrior (Japan)
 Space Battleship Yamato 2202: Warriors of Love (Japan)
 Trinity Seven the Movie: The Eternal Library and the Alchemist Girl (Japan)
 February 28 - The Jetsons & WWE: Robo-WrestleMania! (United States)
 March 4 - Doraemon the Movie 2017: Great Adventure in the Antarctic Kachi Kochi (Japan)
 March 10 - Shimajiro and the Rainbow Oasis (Japan)
 March 11 - Overlord: The Undead King (Japan)
 March 16 - Rabbit School: Guardians of the Golden Egg (Germany)
 March 17 - Kikoriki. Legend of the Golden Dragon (Russia)
 March 18:
 Ancien and the Magic Tablet (Japan)
 Kuroko's Basketball The Movie: Last Game (Japan)
 Pretty Cure Dream Stars! (Japan)
 March 28 - The Swan Princess: Royally Undercover (United States)
 March 31 - The Boss Baby (United States)
 April 4 - Teen Titans: The Judas Contract (United States)
 April 7:
 The Night Is Short, Walk on Girl (Japan)
 Peppa Pig: My First Cinema Experience (United Kingdom)
 Smurfs: The Lost Village (United States)
 April 13 - Barbaricina History (Russia)
 April 15 - Detective Conan: Crimson Love Letter (Japan)
 April 17 - Crayon Shin-chan: Invasion!! Alien Shiriri (Japan)
 April 20 - Fantastic Journey to OZ (Russia)
 April 22 - Free! Timeless Medley (Japan)
 April 27 - Tales from the Lakeside (Hungary)
 May 1 - The Elephant King (Iran and Lebanon)
 May 2 - Where It Floods (United States)
 May 5 - Birds Like Us (Bosnia and Herzegovina, Turkey, United Kingdom, and United States)
 May 6:
 Fairy Tail: Dragon Cry (Japan)
 Little Heroes (Venezuela)
 May 9:
 Alpha and Omega: Journey to Bear Kingdom (United States)
 DC Super Hero Girls: Intergalactic Games (United States)
 May 12 - Sahara (France and Canada)
 May 19 - Lu Over the Wall (Japan)
 May 20:
 Blame! (Japan)
 Tea Pets (China)
 May 24 - Zombillenium (France)
 May 27:
 Bob the Builder: Mega Machines (United States)
 Resident Evil: Vendetta (Japan)
 June 2: 
 Captain Underpants: The First Epic Movie (United States)
 Hanuman Da' Damdaar (India)
 Nur and the Dragon Temple (Spain)
 June 6 - CarGo (United States)
 June 12:
 Ana and Bruno (Mexico)
 Animal Crackers (United States and Spain)
 I'll Just Live in Bando (South Korea)
 June 13:
  (France and Japan)
 Tad Jones: The Hero Returns (Spain)
 June 16 - Cars 3 (United States)
 June 21 - The Big Bad Fox and Other Tales... (France)
 June 23:
 Journey Beyond Sodor (United Kingdom)
 Thomas & Friends: Journey Beyond Sodor (United Kingdom)
 June 27 - Tom and Jerry: Willy Wonka and the Chocolate Factory (United States)
 June 30 - Despicable Me 3 (United States)
 July 1 - Free! Timeless Medley: Part 2 (Japan)
 July 7 - Doru (Turkey)
 July 8 - Mary and the Witch's Flower (Japan)
 July 11 - Lego Scooby-Doo! Blowout Beach Bash (United States)
 July 13 - Da Hu Fa (China)
 July 15 - Pokémon the Movie: I Choose You! (Japan)
 July 22 - Magical Girl Lyrical Nanoha Reflection (Japan)
 July 25 - Lego DC Super Hero Girls: Brain Drain (United States)
 July 26 - The Jungle Bunch (France)
 July 28:
 The Emoji Movie (United States)
 Tofu (China)
 August 4 - T-Guardians (China and South Korea)
 August 10 - Next Door Spy (Denmark)
 August 11 - The Nut Job 2: Nutty by Nature (United States, Canada, and South Korea)
 August 14 - Batman and Harley Quinn (United States)
 August 16 - The Son of Bigfoot (Belgium and France)
 August 17 - The Kuflis (Hungary)
 August 18 - Fireworks (Japan)
 August 24 - Monster Family (Germany and United Kingdom)
 August 25 - Deep (Spain and United States)
 August 31:
 Harvie and the Magic Museum (Russia, Czech Republic, and Belgium)
 The Shower (South Korea)
 September 7 - Lino: An Adventure of Nine Lives (Brazil)
 September 8 - The Breadwinner (Ireland and Canada)
 September 14:
 Cinderella the Cat (Italy)
 Monster Island (Mexico)
 September 16 - Eureka Seven: Hi-Evolution 1 (Japan)
 September 18 - Barbie: Dolphin Magic (United States)
 September 21 - The Lego Ninjago Movie (United States)
 September 25 - Wall (Canada)
 September 28:
 The Legend of King Salomon (Hungary and Israel)
 Lila's Book (Colombia)
 September 30:
 Digimon Adventure tri. Symbiosis (Japan)
 Sound! Euphonium: Todoketai Melody! (Japan)
 October 1 - Howard Lovecraft and the Undersea Kingdom (Canada)
 October 5:
 The Little Vampire 3D (Germany)
 Mission Kathmandu: The Adventures of Nelly & Simon (Canada)
 October 6:
 Anchors Up (Norway)
 Loving Vincent (Poland and United Kingdom)
 My Little Pony: The Movie (United States and Canada)
 October 10 - Batman vs. Two-Face (United States)
 October 12:
 Condorito: La Película (Chile and Peru)
 The Incredible Story of the Giant Pear (Denmark)
 October 14 - Fate/stay night: Heaven's Feel I. Presage Flower (Japan)
 October 15 - On Happiness Road (Taiwan)
 October 21:
 Code Geass Lelouch of the Rebellion: Awakening Path (Japan)
 Virus Tropical (Colombia and Ecuador)
 October 22 - The Angel in the Clock (Mexico)
 October 27 - Mazinger Z: Infinity (Japan)
 October 28:
 The Fixies: Top Secret (Russia)
 Free! -Take Your Marks!- (Japan)
 November 2 - Gnome Alone (United States and Canada)
 November 9 - The Ox (Greece)
 November 11:
 Girls und Panzer: Dai 63 Kai Sensha-dou Zenkoku Koukousei Taikai Soushuuhen (Japan)
 Gekijōban Haikara-san ga Tōru Zenpen – Benio, Hana no 17-sai (Japan)
 November 13 - Mariah Carey's All I Want for Christmas Is You (United States)
 November 16:
 Pipi, Pupu & Rosemary: the Mystery of the Stolen Notes (Italy)
 Tehran Taboo (Austria and Germany)
 November 17:
 Godzilla: Planet of the Monsters (Japan)
 The Star (United States)
 November 22 - Coco (United States)
 November 24 - Hey Arnold!: The Jungle Movie (United States)
 December 1 - Moomins and the Winter Wonderland (Finland and Poland)
 December 9 - Girls und Panzer das Finale: Part 1 (Japan)
 December 13 - Tall Tales (France)
 December 15 - Ferdinand (United States)
 December 22 - Gordon & Paddy (Sweden)
 December 28:
 Si Juki the Movie (Indonesia)
 Three Heroes and the Princess of Egypt (Russia)
 Specific date unknown:
 Beasts of Burden (China and New Zealand)
 The Tale of Peter and Fevronia (Russia)

Television series debuts

Television series endings

Deaths

January
 January 1: Alfonso Wong, Chinese comics artist and animator (Old Master Q), dies at age 93.
 January 10: Tony Rosato, Italian-Canadian actor and comedian (voice of Luigi in The Adventures of Super Mario Bros. 3 and Super Mario World, Orpheus and Young Nomad in Mythic Warriors, Duke in George and Martha, Quentin Eggert in Pelswick, Tom in the Monster by Mistake episode "Warren's Nightmare", Sherriff Ironsides in the Odd Job Jack episode "Odd Job John", Zane in the 6teen episode "Unhappy Anniversary", additional voices in The Busy World of Richard Scarry, Stickin' Around, The Adventures of Sam & Max: Freelance Police, Blaster's Universe, The Ripping Friends, Carl², Da Boom Crew and Detentionaire), dies from a heart attack at age 62.
 January 13: Dick Gautier, American actor, comedian, singer and caricaturist (voice of Rodimus Prime in The Transformers, Serpentor in G.I. Joe: A Real American Hero), dies at age 85.
 January 19: Miguel Ferrer, American actor (voice of Shan Yu in Mulan, Death in Adventure Time, Tarakudo in Jackie Chan Adventures, Vandal Savage in Young Justice, Aquaman and Weather Wizard in Superman: The Animated Series, Agent Hopkins in the American Dad! episode "American Dream Factory", Magister Hulka in the Ben 10: Ultimate Alien episode "Basic Training"), dies from heart failure and complications of throat cancer at age 61.
 January 20: Sooan Kim, Korean-American animator (Teenage Mutant Ninja Turtles, Æon Flux, The Oblongs, The Simpsons), dies at age 62.
 January 25: 
 John Hurt, English actor (voice of Aragorn in The Lord of the Rings, Hazel in Watership Down, Snitter in The Plague Dogs, the Horned King in The Black Cauldron), dies at age 77.
 Jack Mendelsohn, American writer-artist (Hanna-Barbera, Yellow Submarine, Teenage Mutant Ninja Turtles), dies at age 90.
 January 26: Hal Geer, American producer, film editor and animator (Warner Bros. Cartoons), dies at age 100.

February
 February 19: Chris Wiggins, English-born Canadian actor (voice of Thor in The Marvel Super Heroes, Mysterio in Spider-Man, Satan in The Devil and Daniel Mouse, Mr. Sun in the Strawberry Shortcake franchise, No Heart in The Care Bears Family, the narrator in the first episode of the DIC dub of Sailor Moon, Cornelius in the Babar franchise), dies at age 86.
 February 22: Bill Woodson, American actor (narrator in Super Friends), dies at age 99.
 February 25: Bill Paxton, American actor and filmmaker (voice of Eddie Beck in Pixels), dies from a stroke at age 61.

March
 March 10: Tony Haygarth, English actor (voice of Mr. Tweedy in Chicken Run), dies at age 72.
 March 26: Joe Harris, American illustrator and storybook artist (creator of the Trix Rabbit, co-creator of Underdog), dies at age 89.

April
 April 6: Don Rickles, American comedian and actor (voice of Mr. Potato Head in the Toy Story franchise, Cornwall in Quest for Camelot), dies at age 90. 
 April 9: Carolyn Kelly, American comics artist, animator and book designer (Channel Umptee-3), dies from cancer at an unknown age.
 April 11: Merle Welton, American animation checker (Pinocchio and the Emperor of the Night, Rugrats, Tom and Jerry: The Movie, The Simpsons, Dilbert) and continuity coordinator (Disney Television Animation), dies at an unknown age.
 April 13: Ralph Votrian, American actor (voice of Anaheim Electronics Chief in Mobile Suit Gundam 0083: Stardust Memory, Lord Zortek in Gatchaman, King Lexian in Mighty Morphin Power Rangers and Masked Rider, the Narrator in Reign: The Conqueror, Konishi in Kaze no Yojimbo, Sophocles in The Little Polar Bear, Old Galein Musica in Rave Master, the Narrator and Doctor in the As Told by Ginger episode "Gym Class Confidential", Jeff's Grandpa in the Zatch Bell! episode "Rumble in the Snow"), dies at age 82.

May
 May 13: John Cygan, American actor and comedian (voice of Hedley in Treasure Planet, Uncle Lope in Leo the Lion, Richard Kensington in Cars, Who in Horton Hears a Who!, Twitch in Toy Story 3, Male Radio Caller and Gus in Superman/Batman: Apocalypse, Abel North and Kane North in the Ben 10 episode "Super Alien Hero Buddy Adventures", TV Announcer and Man at Police Station in The Grim Adventures of Billy & Mandy episode "Bearded Billy", various characters in Regular Show, additional voices in Space Strikers, Titan A.E., Poochini, Ice Age: The Meltdown, Happily N'Ever After, Surf's Up, WALL-E, Cars Toons, Up, Cloudy with a Chance of Meatballs, The Lorax, Monsters University, Despicable Me 2, The Pirate Fairy, Inside Out, Minions and Despicable Me 3), dies from cancer at age 63.
 May 14:
 Powers Boothe, American actor (voice of Gorilla Grodd in the DC Animated Universe, Red Tornado in Justice League Unlimited, Sunder in Ben 10: Alien Force and Ben 10: Ultimate Alien, Dead Justice in Scooby-Doo! Mystery Incorporated), dies at age 68.
 Brad Grey, American producer (Sammy), dies from cancer at age 59.
 May 31: Tino Insana, American actor (voice of Mr. Grouper in Bubble Guppies, Uncle Ted in Bobby's World, Pig in Barnyard and Back at the Barnyard, and Bushroot in Darkwing Duck), dies at age 69.

June
 June 2: Peter Sallis, English actor (voice of Wallace in Wallace and Gromit), dies at age 96.
 June 9: Adam West, American actor (voice of Batman in The New Adventures of Batman, Tarzan and the Super 7, Super Friends: The Legendary Super Powers Show, The Super Powers Team: Galactic Guardians, The Simpsons episode "Large Marge", Batman: New Times, Batman: Return of the Caped Crusaders and Batman vs. Two-Face, Dog Zero and Leonardo da Vinci in The Secret Files of the Spy Dogs, Mayor Adam West in Family Guy, Catman in The Fairly OddParents, Mayor Grange in The Batman, Jared Moon in Aloha, Scooby-Doo!, Ace in Chicken Little, Uncle Art in Meet the Robinsons, Thomas Wayne and Proto-Bot in Batman: The Brave and the Bold, Wise Old Parrot in Jake and the Never Land Pirates, Captain Super Captain and Professor Evil Professor in Penn Zero: Part-Time Hero, Simon Trent in the Batman: The Animated Series episode "Beware the Gray Ghost", Captain Blasto in the Rugrats episode "Superhero Chuckie", Spruce Wayne/Caped Crusader in the Animaniacs episode "Boo Wonder", Ernest Hemingway in the Histeria! episode "Super Writers", Timothy North/Fearless Ferret in the Kim Possible episode "The Fearless Ferret", R. Kelly's Lawyer in The Boondocks episode "The Trail of Robert Kelly", young Mermaid Man in the SpongeBob SquarePants episode "Back to the Past", Nighthawk in The Super Hero Squad Show episode "Whom Continuity Would Destroy!", Razzle Novak in the Moonbeam City episode "Stuntstravaganza", himself in The Simpsons episode "Mr. Plow", The Critic episode "Eyes on the Prize", the Johnny Bravo episodes "Johnny Bravo Meets Adam West" and "Adam West Date-O-Rama", The Fairly OddParents episodes "Miss Dimmsdale" and "Channel Chasers", and the Futurama episode "Leela and the Genestalk"), dies from leukemia at age 88.
 June 13: Jack Ong, American actor, writer, activist and marketing professional (voice of Chinese Fisherman in The Simpsons episode "Das Bus"), dies from a brain tumor at age 76.
 June 16: Stephen Furst, American actor (voice of Fanboy in Freakazoid!, Sport in Road Rovers, Hathi in Jungle Cubs, Dash in The Little Mermaid II: Return to the Sea, Booster in Buzz Lightyear of Star Command, Male Warthog in the Timon & Pumbaa episode "Home Is Where the Hog Is"), dies from complications related to diabetes at age 63.

July
 July 6: Joan Boocock Lee, English-American model, actress, and wife of Stan Lee (voice of Madame Web in Spider-Man, Miss Forbes in Fantastic Four), dies at age 95.
 July 9: Wally Burr, American actor (voice of Atom in The All-New Super Friends Hour), and director (The Transformers, G.I. Joe: A Real American Hero, Jem, Inspector Gadget, Spider-Man), dies at age 93.
 July 15: Martin Landau, American actor, acting coach, producer and editorial cartoonist (voice of Mac Gargan/Scorpion in Spider-Man, #2 in 9, Mr. Rzykruski in Frankenweenie, The Great Raymondo in The Simpsons episode "The Great Simpsina"), dies from hypovolemic shock at age 89.
 July 18: Harvey Atkin, Canadian actor (voice of Alien/Henchman in Heavy Metal, King Koopa in The Super Mario Bros. Super Show!), dies at age 74. 
 July 26:
 June Foray, American actress (voice of Lucifer in Cinderella, Granny and Witch Hazel in Looney Tunes, Knothead and Splinter in Woody Woodpecker, Rocky the Flying Squirrel, Natasha Fatale and Nell Fenwick in Rocky and Bullwinkle, Jokey Smurf in The Smurfs, Grammi Gummi in Disney's Adventures of the Gummi Bears, Magica De Spell and Ma Beagle in DuckTales, Grandmother Fa in Mulan), dies at age 99.
 Patti Deutsch, American actress and comedian (voice of Mata in The Emperor's New Groove franchise, Tantor's mother in Tarzan, Mrs. Dave in As Told by Ginger, Lucy-2 in Jetsons: The Movie), dies at age 73.

August
 August 8: Glen Campbell, American guitarist, singer, songwriter, actor and television host (voice of Chanticleer in Rock-a-Doodle), dies at age 81.
 August 10: Dell Hake, American conductor and orchestrator (The Powerpuff Girls Movie, The Simpsons), dies at age 73.
 August 20: Jerry Lewis, American comedian, actor, singer, director, producer, writer and humanitarian (voice of the title character in The Nutty Professor, Stationmaster in Curious George 2: Follow That Monkey!, Professor John Frink, Sr. in The Simpsons episode "Treehouse of Horror XIV"), dies from cardiovascular disease at age 91.
 August 24: Jay Thomas, American actor, comedian and radio personality (voice of Ares in Hercules, Barry Anger in Teacher's Pet, Brett Morris in American Dad!, Mr. Sludge in the Goof Troop episode "A Goof of the People", Achmed Abjeer in the Duckman episode "The Road to Dendron", Bull Seal in The Wild Thornberrys episode "Tamper Proof Seal"), dies from throat cancer at age 69.
 August 25: Jack Keil, American advertising executive (creator and voice of McGruff the Crime Dog), dies at age 94.
 August 27: Rochelle Linder, American office manager (Family Guy, American Dad!, The Cleveland Show), dies at age 59.

September
 September 1: Peadar Lamb, Irish actor (voice of Grandpa Piggley Winks in Jakers! The Adventures of Piggley Winks), dies at age 87.
 September 5: Hansford Rowe, American actor (voice of the Thunderer in Spider-Man: The Animated Series), dies at age 93.
 September 10:
 Xavier Atencio, American animator and lyricist (Walt Disney Animation Studios), dies at age 98.
 Len Wein, American comic book writer (DC Comics, Marvel Comics, Bongo Comics), editor and television writer (The Transformers, Batman: The Animated Series, Marvel Animation, Exosquad, Conan and the Young Warriors, Phantom 2040, G.I. Joe Extreme, DIC Entertainment, Street Fighter, Mainframe Entertainment, Godzilla: The Series, RoboCop: Alpha Commando, Kong: The Animated Series, Kappa Mikey, Ben 10, Beware the Batman, Transformers: Robots in Disguise, co-creator of Swamp Thing), dies at age 69.
 September 15: Harry Dean Stanton, American actor, musician and singer (voice of Balthazar in Rango), dies at age 91.
 September 22: Fernando Escandon, Mexican-American actor (voice of El Dorado in Super Friends, Pirate in The Pagemaster, Dr. Salazer in The Real Adventures of Jonny Quest episode "The Mummies of Malenque", Cohila in the Extreme Ghostbusters episode "The Crawler", Professor Spinoza in The Wild Thornberrys episode "Blood Sisters", Don Toro in Jakers! The Adventures of Piggley Winks), dies at age 55.
 September 27: Hugh Hefner, American magazine editor (voiced himself in The Simpsons episode "Krusty Gets Kancelled" and the Family Guy episode "Airport '07"), dies at age 91.
 September 28: Benjamin Whitrow, English actor (voice of Fowler in Chicken Run), dies at age 80.

October
 October 2: Tom Petty, American musician and actor (voice of Lucky and Mud Dobber in King of the Hill, himself in The Simpsons episode "How I Spent My Strummer Vacation"), dies from a drug overdose at age 66.
 October 24: Robert Guillaume, American actor and singer (voice of Rafiki in The Lion King franchise, Detective Catfish in Fish Police, the Narrator in Happily Ever After: Fairy Tales for Every Child, Mr. Thicknose in The Land Before Time VIII: The Big Freeze, Ben in The Adventures of Tom Thumb and Thumbelina, Mr. Corblarb in The Addams Family episode "Color Me Addams", Dr. Parker in The Proud Family episode "Behind Family Lines"), dies from prostate cancer at age 89.

November
 November 17: Earle Hyman, American actor (voice of Panthro in ThunderCats), dies at age 91.
 November 19: Della Reese, American singer and actress (voice of Eema in Dinosaur, the Blue Fairy in the Happily Ever After: Fairy Tales for Every Child episode "Pinocchio"), dies at age 86.
 November 21: David Cassidy, American actor and singer (voice of Roland Pond in the Kim Possible episode "Oh Boyz"), dies at age 67.
 November 29: Heather North, American actress (second voice of Daphne Blake in Scooby-Doo), dies at age 71.

December
 December 8: Josy Eisenberg, French film producer (À Bible Ouverte), dies at age 83.
 December 9: Grant Munro, Canadian animator and film director (Neighbours), dies at age 94.
 December 10: Bruce Brown, American film director (voice of the Narrator in the SpongeBob SquarePants episode "SpongeBob SquarePants vs. The Big One"), dies at age 80.
 December 14: Bob Givens, American animator, character designer, and lay-out artist (Walt Disney Company, Warner Bros. Cartoons, Hanna-Barbera, DePatie-Freleng Enterprises), dies at age 99.
 December 28: Rose Marie, American actress, singer, and comedian (voice of Agatha Caulfield in the Hey Arnold! episode "Crabby Author", Mrs. Spengler in The Real Ghostbusters episode "Ghostworld", Lotta Litter in the Yogi's Gang episode "Lotta Litter", Honna in the Freakazoid! episode "Lawn Gnomes: Chapter IV – Fun in the Sun"), dies at age 94.

See also 
2017 in anime
List of animated television series of 2017

References

External links 
Animated works of the year, listed in the IMDb

 
2010s in animation
Animation